Ariza Makukula (born 4 March 1981) is a Portuguese former footballer who played as a centre forward.

He only amassed Primeira Liga totals of 26 matches and nine goals over three seasons for Marítimo, Benfica and Vitória de Setúbal, spending the vast majority of his professional career abroad. He competed in Spain, England, Turkey, Greece and Thailand, winning the UEFA Cup with Sevilla in 2006 and being Süper Lig top scorer with Kayserispor in 2009–10.

Makukula earned four caps for the Portugal national team, during three and a half months.

Club career

Early career
The son of Kuyangana Makukula, a Congolese footballer who played seven years in Portugal for four clubs, mainly Vitória de Setúbal, his mother being Portuguese, Makukula was born in Kinshasa, then in Zaire. He moved to Portugal at age five to live in Matosinhos as his father played for Leixões S.C. and then to Setúbal after the transfer to Vitória, where he began in the youth ranks.

After a spell at G.D. Chaves, Makukula concluded his development at Vitória de Guimarães, where he and César Peixoto were also loaned to nearby Brito SC. Through agent Jorge Mendes and his Gestifute company, he transferred to begin his professional career in Spain for UD Salamanca and CD Leganés, scoring 20 goals with the former in the 2001–02 season – spent in the second division – second-best in the competition.

Nantes
While Mendes tried to get Makukula a transfer to teams including Juventus FC, he moved in the summer of 2002 to play with FC Nantes in France on his father's recommendation, having been educated Lycée français Charles Lepierre in Lisbon. He split the campaign between the first team and the reserves and scoring one Ligue 1 goal to equalise in a 2–1 loss at AS Monaco FC on 11 September 2002. He was subsequently loaned to Real Valladolid, netting eight times but suffering relegation from La Liga; he opened his account in the Spanish top flight with two goals on 27 September 2003 away to RC Celta de Vigo, who recovered to win 3–2. His season ended the following January through a knee injury, ruling him out for nearly a full year.

Sevilla
Makukula was then bought in June 2004 by another side in the same league, Sevilla FC, for an estimated €3.5 million of which 10% went to Salamanca. His new team beat their city rivals Real Betis to his signature.

Due to his ongoing injury, Makukula did not debut for the Nervión club until 8 January 2005, when he came on as a 56th-minute substitute for Carlitos in a goalless home draw with Getafe CF, in which he was booked. His first goal on 2 February was consolation in a 3–1 loss (4–3 aggregate) away to CA Osasuna in the Copa del Rey quarter-finals, followed four days later with his only league goal in a 3–0 win at Levante UD. On 24 February, he came on in the 79th minute at home to Panathinaikos F.C. as Sevilla trailed 1–0 from the first leg in the UEFA Cup last 32, and four minutes later scored in an eventual 2–0 win.

In 2005–06, with Juande Ramos having replaced Joaquín Caparrós as manager, Makukula's injuries continued and he had to deal with the signings of fellow forwards Luís Fabiano, Javier Saviola and Frédéric Kanouté. He played one game all season, namely 13 minutes and a yellow card in extra time in the UEFA Cup semi-final second leg against FC Schalke 04 on 27 April 2006, after Antonio Puerta had scored the only goal for the eventual champions.

In August 2006, Makukula was loaned Gimnàstic de Tarragona, newly promoted to Spain's top flight. He scored his only goal of 14 games on his sixth appearance on 15 October, coming off the bench in a 3–2 home loss to Athletic Bilbao; on 27 May 2007, as his team lost 2–0 to Atlético Madrid to descend to the second division, he was sent off at the Nou Estadi de Tarragona.

Benfica
In July 2007, Makukula was loaned again to C.S. Marítimo in his adopted nation. He made his debut on 18 August on the first day of the Primeira Liga season  at home to F.C. Paços de Ferreira and scored twice in a 3–1 win; on 2 September also at the Estádio do Marítimo he scored, was booked for his celebration and was sent off for violent conduct towards Paulo Sérgio all in the first seven minutes of a 2–0 victory against Académica de Coimbra.

After seven top-flight goals in only 13 matches, Makukula transferred to S.L. Benfica for €3.5 million and four and a half years in late January 2008. On 14 February, he scored the game's only goal in a home win against 1. FC Nürnberg in the UEFA Cup round of 32.

Makukula was not used at all by Benfica in the first part of 2008–09. On 16 January 2009, after a move to West Bromwich Albion fell through, he signed for fellow Premier League team Bolton Wanderers on loan until the end of the campaign with a view to a permanent move costing around £4.5 million in the summer. He made his debut a day later against Manchester United, playing 64 minutes in a 0–1 home loss.

Later career
On 11 August 2009, Makukula was loaned again, now to Süper Lig club Kayserispor in Turkey. He ended the season as the competition's top scorer, with eight goals more than the second player as his team finished eighth.

In the very last minutes of the 2010 summer transfer window Makukula signed a three-year deal with another side in the country, Manisaspor, for €2 million. He alleged that he was never paid there and, in the summer of 2012, he agreed to a contract with another Turkish team, Karşıyaka S.K. in division two. He was released in January of the following year, returning to his country of adoption after five years and joining Vitória de Setúbal. Suffering with knee and meniscus injuries and disputes with the organisation, he cancelled the second year of his contract and did not request compensation for it.

Makukula headed back abroad in September 2013, joining Super League Greece bottom team OFI Crete F.C. on a one-year deal with the option of a second. The following February, he rescinded his contract at the club led by compatriot Ricardo Sá Pinto and joined BEC Tero Sasana F.C. in Thailand. Disappointed by the facilities in Bangkok, he terminated his deal two months later. He returned to his birth country, and became sporting director and ambassador of their national team.

International career
Makukula chose to represent Portugal internationally. He started playing for the under-21s, appearing in the 2002 UEFA European Championship.

As a senior, Makukula tried to switch to DR Congo, but a FIFA amended rule regarding international careers came out in 2005, stating that change in nationality representation should occur before a player's 21st birthday and if they have not yet gained their first full cap, so he was denied in his intentions (he was 23 at time of rule, which was abolished in 2009). In October 2007, after solid performances with Marítimo, he was called up to the Portugal squad for a UEFA Euro 2008 qualifier against Kazakhstan on the 17th, after Nuno Gomes suffered an injury: in the 84th minute of the game, he scored the first goal in an eventual 2–1 away win.

Although not part of 24-men Portuguese 2010 FIFA World Cup provisional squad, Makukula was named in a backup list of six players, although he did not make the final cut.

Personal life
Makukula met his wife while playing for Nantes, and they had four children before their divorce. He named his first son Aziz Del Nido after Sevilla president José María del Nido, out of gratitude for signing him while long-term injured.

While buying a house in Lisbon after signing for Benfica, Makukula allowed agent Ricardo Rodrigues to withdraw €200,000 from his bank account. The agent took the cash, while lying that he had been robbed by "four black men" in the problem neighbourhood of Vale da Amoreira. The money was recovered in court.

Makukula, a Catholic, attended mass every Sunday.

Career statistics

Club

International goals
Scores and results list Portugal's goal tally first, score column indicates score after Makukula goal.

Honours
Sevilla
UEFA Cup: 2005–06

References

External links
 
 
 
 
 
 

1981 births
Living people
Portuguese people of Democratic Republic of the Congo descent
Portuguese Roman Catholics
Footballers from Kinshasa
Portuguese footballers
Association football forwards
Primeira Liga players
Vitória S.C. players
C.S. Marítimo players
S.L. Benfica footballers
Vitória F.C. players
La Liga players
Segunda División players
UD Salamanca players
CD Leganés players
Real Valladolid players
Sevilla FC players
UEFA Cup winning players
Gimnàstic de Tarragona footballers
Ligue 1 players
FC Nantes players
Premier League players
Bolton Wanderers F.C. players
Süper Lig players
TFF First League players
Kayserispor footballers
Manisaspor footballers
Karşıyaka S.K. footballers
Super League Greece players
OFI Crete F.C. players
Ariza Makukula
Portugal under-21 international footballers
Portugal international footballers
Portuguese expatriate footballers
Expatriate footballers in Spain
Expatriate footballers in France
Expatriate footballers in England
Expatriate footballers in Turkey
Expatriate footballers in Greece
Expatriate footballers in Thailand
Portuguese expatriate sportspeople in Spain
Portuguese expatriate sportspeople in France
Portuguese expatriate sportspeople in England
Portuguese expatriate sportspeople in Turkey
Portuguese expatriate sportspeople in Greece
Portuguese expatriate sportspeople in Thailand